"Tempo" is a song by American singer Chris Brown from his eighth studio album, Heartbreak on a Full Moon (2017). It was released by RCA Records as the sixth single from the album on February 6, 2018. The song rose to number 36 on Billboards Hot R&B/Hip-hop singles chart during the week of April 7.

Music video
On March 2, 2018, Brown uploaded the music video for "Tempo" on his YouTube and Vevo account.

Charts

Weekly charts

Year-end charts

Certifications

References

2017 songs
Songs written by Chris Brown
Chris Brown songs